Parmoli is a village and Union Council of Swabi District in Khyber Pakhtunkhwa, Pakistan.

Parmoli is situated in the northwest of Swabi city. It is one of the largest union councils of Razar Tehsil district in Swabi. Shewa, Ghulama, Narangi, Ali Abad, Khesha and Mehr Ali are its neighbour villages. Parmoli grand canal also passes through it which come from swat. There is one large high school for males and one for females, as well as five primary schools for males and three for females.
Ziwar Shah Baba have 6 Sons:
1.Rahim Shah
2.Sultan Shah
3.Rehman Shah
4.Mustaghan Shah
5.Sahawat Shah
6.Feroz Shah.
Rahim Shah Baba have 3 Sons:
1. Engr Abdullah Shah
2. Said Bakht Shah
3. Engr Lal Bakht Shah.
Engr Abdullah Shah have 3 Sons:
1. Abdul Arif Shah
2. Anwar Basit Shah
3. Raja Dildar Shah.

References

External links

Populated places in Swabi District
Union Councils of Swabi District